Robert Vickers Bardsley  (28 June 1890 – 26 July 1952) was an English cricketer and colonial administrator.

Biography

Born in Prestwich, Lancashire, Bardsley was educated at Shrewsbury School and Merton College, Oxford. He played a total of 31 first-class matches for Oxford University, Lancashire County Cricket Club and Free Foresters between 1910 and 1922. He was awarded a Blue for cricket and played in the University Match against Cambridge in three seasons between 1911 and 1913.

Bardsley went on to be Private Secretary to the Governor-General of Sudan from 1924 to 1925 and then Governor of the Blue Nile Province from 1928 to 1932.

References

1890 births
1952 deaths
English cricketers
Oxford University cricketers
Lancashire cricketers
Free Foresters cricketers
Sportspeople from Prestwich
Companions of the Order of St Michael and St George
Officers of the Order of the British Empire
Alumni of Merton College, Oxford
Gentlemen of England cricketers
Oxford and Cambridge Universities cricketers
People educated at Shrewsbury School